Robert S. Bainbridge (January 21, 1913 – April 1959) was an American politician from New York.

Life
He was born on January 21, 1913, in Staten Island, New York City, the son of John Keeble Bainbridge (1883–1948) and Adah (Wing) Bainbridge (1885–1927). He was an insurance broker. In 1935, he married Maxine Louis Ginder, of Dayton, Ohio, and they had two children.

Bainbridge was a member of the New York State Senate from 1943 to 1946, sitting in the 164th and 165th New York State Legislatures. In November 1947, he ran again for the State Senate but was defeated by Democrat John M. Braisted, Jr.

He died in 1959; and was buried at the Dayton Memorial Park in Dayton, Ohio.

Sources

External links
 

1913 births
1959 deaths
People from Staten Island
Republican Party New York (state) state senators
20th-century American politicians